This article lists major events that happened in 2018 in the Netherlands.

Incumbents
 Monarch: Willem-Alexander
 Prime Minister: Mark Rutte (VVD)
 Speaker of the House of Representatives: Khadija Arib (PvdA)
 President of the Senate: Ankie Broekers-Knol (VVD)

Events
6 February – Ronald Koeman takes over as coach of the Netherlands national football team
12 February – opening of Waddinxveen Triangel railway station
13 February – Halbe Zijlstra (VVD) resigns as Minister of Foreign Affairs
1 March – Ambassador and Permanent Representative of the Netherlands to the United Nations Karel van Oosterom is appointed President of the United Nations Security Council for one month
6 March – a mentally disturbed man armed with two knives tries to enter a school in Alphen aan den Rijn; a group of students chases him off by throwing bags at him before his arrest by police officers
21 March – 2018 Dutch municipal elections and 2018 Dutch Intelligence and Security Services Act referendum
22 March – a man attempts suicide by jumping off the public gallery of the House of Representatives
28 March – opening of Eemshaven railway station
15 April – PSV Eindhoven wins the 2017–18 Eredivisie
17 June – at the Pinkpop Festival in Landgraaf, one falls dead after a van crashed into a crowd; the driver turns himself in to the police the day after
19 June – police forces arrest three men in Rotterdam, Schinnen and Groningen suspected of planning a terrorism act; two other men suspected of planning a terrorist attack had been arrested two days before in Rotterdam in an unrelated case
11 July – Andries Heidema (CU) is appointed to be the King's Commissioner of Overijssel
12 July – Femke Halsema (GL) takes over as Mayor of Amsterdam
21 July – opening of the North–South Line (Route 52) of the Amsterdam Metro
31 August – 2018 Amsterdam stabbing attack, the Afghan perpetrator is arrested after wounding two American tourists
13 September – a woman disrupts an event in Schiedam attended by Queen Máxima, yelling about the situation of her handicapped son and holding a letter; she is held away by police officers before the Queen approached her to talk and take the letter
 20 September – a Moroccan man previously convicted in the death of Richard Nieuwenhuizen and several other affairs is banned from the Netherlands for a period of 10 years, the Immigration and Naturalisation Service (IND) stating that he represented a grave threat to public safety
 9 October – Rob Jetten becomes leader of the Democrats 66 in the House of Representatives
 14 October – Mayor Jos Wienen (VVD) gives a speech from the balcony of the City Hall of Haarlem, accompanied by Deputy Prime Minister Kajsa Ollongren, after Wienen received death threats
 17–21 October – Amsterdam Dance Event, Dutch DJ Martin Garrix wins DJ Mag's Top 100 first place for the third time
 1 November – Jeanine Hennis-Plasschaert is appointed Special Representative of the Secretary-General for the United Nations Assistance Mission for Iraq; Thom de Graaf becomes Vice-President of the Council of State
 19 November – NCTV Dick Schoof is appointed as new Director of the General Intelligence and Security Service (AIVD)
 9 December – opening of Lansingerland-Zoetermeer railway station

See also
 2017–18 Eredivisie
 List of Dutch Top 40 number-one singles of 2018
 Netherlands in the Eurovision Song Contest 2018
 Netherlands in the Junior Eurovision Song Contest 2018

Deaths

2 January – Eugène Gerards, footballer (b. 1940)

12 January – Eddy Beugels, cyclist (b. 1944)

14 January – John Pierik, sports shooter (b. 1949)

15 January – Roderick Rijnders, rower (b. 1941)

19 January – Dik Abed, cricketer (b. 1944)

20 January – Antonius Jan Glazemaker, Roman Catholic archbishop (b. 1931)

22 January – Reinier Kreijermaat, footballer (b. 1935)

24 January – Jan Steeman, comics artist (b. 1933)

31 January – Hennie Hollink, footballer (b. 1931)

12 February – Martin van der Borgh, racing cyclist (b. 1934)

14 February – Ruud Lubbers, former Prime Minister (b. 1939)

26 February – Mies Bouwman, television presenter (b. 1929)

21 March – Rolf Leeser, footballer and fashion designer (b. 1929)

22 March – Johan van Hulst, school director, politician (b. 1911)

31 March – Jan Snoeck, sculptor and ceramist (b. 1927)

23 April – Henk Temming, footballer (b. 1923)

2 May – Herman Krebbers, violinist (b. 1923) 

4 May – Renate Dorrestein, writer (b. 1954)

10 July – Mien Schopman-Klaver, athlete (b. 1911)

4 October – Bert Romp, Olympic equestrian, gold medalist (b. 1958).
20 October – Wim Kok, former Prime Minister (b. 1938)

References

 
2010s in the Netherlands
Years of the 21st century in the Netherlands
Netherlands
Netherlands